Oakridge is a village in Hampshire, England, and is located in the north of Basingstoke within the ring road. It's more of a suburb than a village, because it's part of Basingstoke.

History
The area was built with mansionettes as part of the rapid expansion of Basingstoke.

The new estate did not age well. The area became increasingly run down and proved hard to let. In 1997, a group called the Oakridge Central Regeneration group was set up with the intention of having the estate redeveloped. HTA Architects were appointed and planning permission was granted in 2000. The redevelopment was built in phases: Phase 1 consisted of mostly terraced housing, Phase 2 consisted of three-storey apartments and Phase 3 was built by a different contractor. 149 homes were replaced with 299, increasing the density of the area, but also green space.

As part of the original planning, a 13-storey tower block, Oakridge Tower, was planned for demolition. After local pressure, it has been retained.
People call it a suburb instead of a village, because it's a part of Basingstoke. 

Villages in Hampshire
Areas of Basingstoke